The 1918 Rice Owls football team was an American football team that represented Rice University as a member of the Southwest Conference (SWC) during the 1918 college football season. In its first season under head coach John E. Anderson, the team compiled a 1–5–1 record (1–1 against SWC opponents) and was outscored by a total of 62 to 13.

Schedule

References

Rice
Rice Owls football seasons
Rice Owls football